Satya Bhusan Burman (born May 1907) was an Indian judge and former Chief Justice of Orissa High Court.

Career
Burman was born in 1907. He studied at Mitra Institution, Kolkata and Presidency College. He passed Law from Hazra Law College, University of Calcutta. Burman became Bar at Law from the Lincoln’s Inn, London. In 1932 he was called to the English Bar. Burman was appointed additional Judge of the Orissa High Court on 3 February 1958. He was elevated to the post of Chief Justice of Orissa High Court in 1967 according to the proposal of Sudhi Ranjan Das, Chief Justice of India. Justice Burman retired from the judgeship on 30 April 1969.

References

1907 births
Year of death missing
Judges of the Orissa High Court
Chief Justices of the Orissa High Court
Members of Lincoln's Inn
University of Calcutta alumni
Presidency University, Kolkata alumni
Indian barristers